The Naval Security Team (NST;) is a deployable and self-sustained Royal Canadian Navy (RCN) force protection unit established in 2016 tasked to augment the Canadian naval fleet's existing force protection assets in expeditionary or domestic environments. 

Directly reporting to Maritime Forces Pacific at CFB Esquimalt, in addition to force protection the NST also provides intelligence support and opportunities for Canadian Forces Naval Reserve members to deploy overseas. Primarily composed of naval reservists, with Regular Force augmentees, the 60-person unit of selected personnel train for and deploy on individual missions and are then stood down following mission completion.

Operational history 
The NST first deployed in 2017, supporting the crew of  during their port visit to Busan, South Korea. While in Busan, the NST provided on-water security for HMCS Winnipeg with two Defender-class patrol boats and shore-based sentries working alongside Republic of Korea Navy personnel.

Since then, in June 2019 the first group of NST personnel received new qualification badges and the unit provided support to RCN port visits to the United Arab Emirates and Italy.

Equipment 
The NST operates 5 Defender-class boat equipped with one C9A2 and one C6 machine gun. These boats are used for harbour security patrols. 

While NST members are armed with a SIG Sauer P225 pistol and a Colt Canada C8 carbine.

References

External links 
Naval Security Team Facebook Page
The Naval Security Team YouTube Clip

Canadian Forces Naval Reserve
Organizations based in British Columbia
2016 establishments in Canada
Military units and formations established in 2016